German submarine U-304 was a Type VIIC U-boat of Nazi Germany's Kriegsmarine during World War II. She saw service in the Atlantic Ocean and Mediterranean Sea. Built in 1941 and 1942 at Flender-Werke, Lübeck, U-304 was a Type VIIC U-boat, capable of lengthy ocean patrols and of operating in distant environments.

Design
German Type VIIC submarines were preceded by the shorter Type VIIB submarines. U-304 had a displacement of  when at the surface and  while submerged. She had two shafts and two  propellers.

U-304 was fitted with five  torpedo tubes (four fitted at the bow and one at the stern), fourteen torpedoes, one  SK C/35 naval gun, 220 rounds, and two twin  C/30 anti-aircraft guns. The boat had a complement of between forty-four and sixty.

Service history
U-304 was launched on 13 June 1942 and commissioned 5 August 1942. All 46 crew members died in the event.

Wolfpacks
U-304 took part in three wolfpacks, namely:
 Without name (7 – 10 May 1943) 
 Isar (10 – 15 May 1943) 
 Donau 1 (15 – 26 May 1943)

References

Bibliography

External links

German Type VIIC submarines
Ships lost with all hands
1942 ships
Ships built in Lübeck
U-boats commissioned in 1942
U-boats sunk in 1943
U-boats sunk by British aircraft
World War II shipwrecks in the Atlantic Ocean
World War II submarines of Germany
Maritime incidents in May 1943